The Seven Bar Foundation is a social enterprise that uses cause marketing initiatives and the luxury lingerie industry to support microfinance. It is a 501(c)(3) nonprofit organization based out of New York, New York, that raises funds for microfinance institutions (MFIs) to help impoverished women start and expand their businesses.

Model 
The Seven Bar Foundation is a social enterprise, a nonprofit that uses business models for social impact. The Foundation relies on commercial markets for a consistent revenue stream in place of relying on donor funding, which may be more unpredictable and limited. Seven Bar uses the European lingerie industry as a marketing platform.

History 
Seven Bar is a third-generation family involved in general aviation, real estate development, and investments established in New Mexico beginning in the 1950s. Seven Bar and the Black family established the Seven Bar Foundation in 2001 with activities in eight states, contributing to community development projects in each.

Logo 
The pink bars in Seven Bar Foundation's logo represent a "ladder" – an exit strategy out of poverty for women. The concept is based on the eighth step of Maimonides' Golden Ladder, "To prevent poverty by teaching a trade, setting up a person in business, or in some other way preventing the need of charity."

Renata M. Black 
Renata Mutis Black has fought poverty in 12 different countries, working with terminally disabled children in Hong Kong, mentally disabled elders in New Zealand, and victims of the 2004 tsunami in India. The events of the 2004 tsunami centralized her vision toward microfinance.

Black and her husband narrowly evaded the destruction of the tsunami when their flight to Thailand was cancelled because of a mechanical failure. After the disaster, Black immediately went to help rebuild the villages impacted by the catastrophic flooding. During this project, a woman from the region approached her and said, "I know you have money and I don't want it. But why don't you teach me how to make it myself?" This encounter sparked a new course for Black, who immersed herself in the study of microloans and their impact on impoverished communities with 2006 Nobel Prize winner Muhammad Yunus. Black then applied her training by establishing a grassroots microfinance endeavor in India that exists to this day.

Having seen the transformative force of microfinance through her program in India. Black redirected the mission of the Seven Bar Foundation. To fund these institutions on a consistent and global basis. She found that microfinance presents these women. With the tools to create an exit strategy out of poverty and allows them to become self-sufficient.

Events

Lingerie New York 
Operating on the tagline "empowering women on a G-string rather than a shoestring," Lingerie New York was produced by fashion week regular Lynne O'Neill and showcased the latest collections of lingerie designers Atsuko Kudo and Carine Gilson. It was held in October 2010 at NYC's historic landmark Cipriani 42nd Street. Michelle Rodriguez DJed the event and supermodel Veronica Webb. Showcased a "space lace" corset made of injection-molded fiberglass. Designed by Dara Young. The event featured a performance by the Imaginaerial Entertainment Group. A cirque-style aerial silk act in which eight aerialists constructed a human Y. Also in attendance were host Sofia Vergara and media and fashion mogul Russell Simmons. Lingerie New York raised over $200,000 in the name of microfinance for women.

Lingerie Miami 
Lingerie Miami took place in front of the Vizcaya Palace in Coral Gables, Florida, on February 7, 2009, showcasing European lingerie designers Agent Provocateur, Fifi Chachnil, and Carine Gilson on the same stage for the first time. The event was hosted by Eva Longoria, co-hosted by Veronica Webb, DJed by high fashion model Ève Salvail, and featured guest speaker Deepak Chopra. Guests were served a three-course meal, cocktails by Belvedere and champagne by Moet & Chandon. Lingerie Miami featured a live and silent auction, including a private tour of the Desperate Housewives set in Los Angeles and a kiss with Eva Longoria that sold for $35,000. The event raised over $180,000, funding microloans for 2,233 women, and garnered over 177 million media impressions.

See also 
 Kiva (organization)
 Women's World Banking
 Opportunity International

References 
  Seven Bar Foundation - About Us
  Seven Bar Foundation - About Us - The Golden Ladder of Giving
  Seven Bar Foundation - Director's Profile
  Chopra, Deepak. "Renata M. Black, Founding Director of Seven Bar Foundation." The Soul of Leadership. New York: Harmony, 2010. Print.
  The New York Times Style Magazine - Photo Diary | Lingerie New York
  Party Builders Bonus Material: Supermodel Veronica Webb Talks Lingerie and Microfinance
  Party Builders Bonus Material: Aerialists Construct a Human Y at Lingerie New York
  Party Builders Episode 2: Lingerie New York Ready to Rock!
  Seven Bar Foundation - Lingerie New York - Partners
  Party Builders Episode 1: Lingerie New York Impacts the World with a Mix of Fashion and Microfinance
  Style.com Lingerie Miami Brings the Sizzle
  Seven Bar Foundation - Lingerie Miami 2009
  Seven Bar Foundation - Fusion Beauty
  Sephora - Fusion Beauty - LipFusion Luxe Boudoir
  Social Miami - Lingerie Miami
  Royal Asscher - Seven Bar Foundation - How It All Started
  Royal Asscher - How Does It Work

Microfinance organizations
Social enterprises
Non-profit organizations based in New York (state)
Women's occupational organizations
501(c)(3) organizations
2001 establishments in New York City
Organizations established in 2001